The Tulpehocken Area School District is a school district located in northwestern Berks County, Pennsylvania. The district serves three different schools. Penn-Bernville Elementary and Bethel Elementary are the two elementary schools that enroll students in Kindergarten through 6th Grade. Penn-Bernville Elementary is the 2011 Recipient of The Blue Ribbon School for Excellence Award Lighthouse School.  The Tulpehocken Jr/Sr High School, located in Jefferson Township, enrolls the rest of the students, 7th through 12th Grade. The district serves the borough of Bernville, as well as the townships of Bethel, Jefferson, Penn, and Tulpehocken.The Tulpehocken Area School District also offers students an online alternative to cyber-charter school education called the Tulpehocken Virtual Academy. The District is one of the 500 public school districts of Pennsylvania.

School districts in Berks County, Pennsylvania